Cape Turnagain is a prominent headland on the east coast of New Zealand's North Island, part way between Hawke Bay and Cook Strait, between the mouths of the Porangahau and Ākitio Rivers.

The cape was named by Captain James Cook in 1769. On his journey of discovery, he sailed south to this point where he was met with atrocious sea conditions, typical of the area. Being unable to safely proceed, he decided to turn and head north  and sailed anticlockwise   around the North Island of New Zealand and upon reaching the same place turned again southwards & named the point as a result of his decision.

The Māori name for Cape Turnagain is Te Aho a Māui, which means “Māui’s fishing line”, in reference to the Māori mythology story of Māui and his brothers fishing up the land mass now known as the North Island.

References

Landforms of Manawatū-Whanganui
Turnagain, Cape
Manawatū-Whanganui